The Hanover stabbing that occurred on 26 February 2016 was a terrorist stabbing of a police officer in Hanover, Germany, by a 15-year-old girl. It was the first reported attack by an ISIS sympathiser in Germany.

Incident
On 26 February 2016, two police officers approached a 15-year-old and asked for her identification papers. The girl stabbed a police officer in the back of the neck at Hanover Central Station, causing severe injuries. The officer survived after surgery. After her arrest, police found a second and larger knife. This was the first reported lone-wolf terrorist attack by a sympathizer of the Islamic State in Germany.

Perpetrator
The 15-year-old perpetrator was born in Hanover to a Moroccan mother and a German father who converted to Islam. At age 7, she appeared in a video reciting the Quran with the German Salafist preacher Pierre Vogel.

The Federal Office for the Protection of the Constitution, Germany's domestic intelligence agency, started investigating the girl for preparing a serious crime in 2014; NDR television reported that the day after the Paris attacks she described it as the "happiest day of my life", adding: "Allah bless our lions".

According to a Deutsche Welle report, a family member called authorities expressing concerns over radicalisation, and police met with the family days later.

In November 2015, the perpetrator traveled to Istanbul where she met members of ISIL, who planned to help her with entry into Syria. In January 2016 she returned to Germany. It is reported in court that orders to carry out a "martyrdom attack" in Germany were given.

Trial and sentencing
The trial began in October 2016; the press were banned due to the accused being a minor.  Safia S. was convicted of attempted murder, helping a terrorist organization, and of grievous bodily harm, and was sentenced to 6 years in prison.

Accomplice
Mohamad Hasan K., a man born in Syria, was accused of being an accomplice of Safia. S. and of planning a separate terror attack in 2015.  As co-defendant of Safia S., he was sentenced to 2.5 years in jail as he knew of the attack but failed to alert the government.

See also
 October 2016 Hamburg stabbing attack

References

2016 in Germany
21st century in Hanover
February 2016 crimes in Europe
February 2016 events in Germany
ISIL terrorist incidents in Germany
Islamic terrorism in Germany
Islamic terrorist incidents in 2016
Stabbing attacks in 2016
Stabbing attacks in Germany
Terrorist incidents in Germany in 2016
Terrorist incidents involving knife attacks
2010s in Lower Saxony